The Kymco Venox is a cruiser style motorcycle produced by Taiwanese Kwang Yang Motor Company under the Kymco brand. While it is the largest motorcycle made by Kymco (though they offer larger scooters and ATVs), at 249 cc the Venox is considered a light cruiser.

Engine
The Venox's engine cylinders are set in a 90° V-twin configuration. It has dual dual overhead cams, four valves per cylinder, and is liquid cooled.

Styling
Kymco hired German firm Naumann Design to design the Venox. Naumann also designed the MZ 1000S, as well as projects for Honda and Audi.

The Venox is designed in the cruiser style with several design elements being borrowed from popular bikes made by other manufacturers.  The solid rear wheel, for example, is reminiscent of the Harley-Davidson V-Rod and the Fat Boy's solid front. The distinctive trumpeted twin exhaust as well as the front wheel has been described as echoing the Honda Magna.

Certain aspects of the Venox's design more closely resemble larger displacement bikes. The  wheelbase is typical of a bike with a 500-700 cc engine.  Faux chrome plates under the 3.7 gallon fuel tank, already a gallon more than other light cruisers, give it the appearance of a long range cruiser.  Overall, most dealership and road tester informal surveys show that many bikers guess the Venox at an engine displacement between 500 and 800 cc.

The bike has no tachometer, but the engine has a rev limiter which does not allow a rider to take the engine beyond its redline. The fuel valve on the Venox is automatic. It does not need to be switched to on before starting, automatically switches to reserve when low, and is connected to a low fuel light on the instrument panel.

Venox 250i
An updated version, the Venox 250i, was introduced in 2006.

References

External links

 
 Venox review in Total Motorcycle
 Rider Magazine Venox 250i review

Kymco motorcycles
Cruiser motorcycles